"Stay Down" is a song by American singer Mary J. Blige, taken from her eighth studio album, Growing Pains (2007). It was written by Blige along with Johnta Austin and Bryan-Michael Cox, while production was helmed by Box. Released as the album's third and final single, it replaced "Hurt Again", that was released for a short time for airplay, but at the last minute was canceled in the favor of "Stay Down".

Music video
A music video for "Stay Down" was directed by Hype Williams and premiered on April 17, 2008. It features several close shots of Blige as well as many landscape scenes.

Credits and personnel 
Credits adapted from the Growing Pains liner notes.

Johnta Austin – writer
Nick Banns – additional engineer
Mary J. Blige – vocals, writer
Dru Castro – additional engineer
Bryan-Michael Cox – producer, writer
Ron Fair – arrangement, conductor
Kuk Harrell – vocal producer, recording
Alec Newell – recording
Chris "Tek" O'Ryan – additional engineer
Sam Thomas – recording

Charts

References

2007 songs
2008 singles
Mary J. Blige songs
Music videos directed by Hype Williams
Songs written by Johntá Austin
Songs written by Mary J. Blige
Contemporary R&B ballads
Soul ballads
Songs written by Bryan-Michael Cox
Song recordings produced by Bryan-Michael Cox
2000s ballads

pl:Stay Down (singel Mary Jane Blige)